The International Association for Military Pedagogy (IAMP) was founded in November 2005 in Strausberg (Germany) as a successor to the European Military Pedagogy Forum (EMPF).

The IAMP is an independent network of professionals whose studies focus on education and training in the military setting. Its goals include the spreading of information that would assist professional military institutions of advanced learning (e.g. military academies and staff colleges). The purpose of IAMP activities is to encourage discussion and  development in the theory of military pedagogy. Academics concerned with such subjects in civilian institutions of higher learning can participate in the Association.

The Association accomplishes its goals by promoting research, publication, and information sharing among its membership. The IAMP establishes contacts among military institutions of higher learning, as well as among national and international agencies. Annual conferences are hosted by member institutions.

Membership is open to individuals with a professional interest in military pedagogy.

Members 
Members include military and civilian professionals from military institutions of advanced learning such as:
 Austria:  National Defence Academy
 Baltic states: Baltic Defence College 
 Croatia: Croatian Defense Academy 
 Denmark: Royal Danish Defence College
 Finland: National Defence University 
 Germany: Bundeswehr University Munich
 Israel: Command & General Staff College, Tactical Command College 
 Norway: Norwegian Defence University College
 Romania: Carol I National Defence University 
 Sweden: Swedish National Defence College 
 Switzerland: Armed Forces College (Military Academy at ETH Zurich)
 United Kingdom: Educational and Training Services Branch (British Army), Joint Services Command and Staff College

Publications (selection)
 Annen, Hubert & Royl, W. (Eds.). (2007). Military Pedagogy in Progress. Studies for Military Pedagogy, Military Science & Security Policy, Vol. 10. Frankfurt a.M.; Berlin; Bern; Bruxelles; New York; Oxford; Wien: Peter Lang. 
 Florian, Heinz (Ed.). (2002). Military Pedagogy: An International Survey. Studies for Military Pedagogy, Military Science & Security Policy, Vol. 8. Frankfurt a.M.; Berlin; Bern; Bruxelles; New York; Oxford; Wien: Peter Lang. 
 Mardar, S. & Malos, G. (Eds.). (2007). Educating and Training Officers for Interoperability. The 7th International Conference on Military Pedagogy. Bucharest: "Carol I" National Defence University Publishing House. 
 Micewski, E. & Annen, H. (Eds.). (2005). Military Ethics in Professional Military Education - Revisited. Studies for Military Pedagogy, Military Science & Security Policy, Vol. 9. Frankfurt a.M.; Berlin; Bern; Bruxelles; New York; Oxford; Wien: Peter Lang. 
 Toiskallio, J. (Ed.). (2007). Ethical Education in the Military. What, How and Why in the 21st Century? Helsinki: ACIE Publications. National Defence University. Department of Education. Series 1, N:o 1. 
 Kozina, A. (2015) "The Hidden Curriculum in Military Schools" Security and Defence. No 1, (6); Warshaw, ISSN 2300-8741

See also 
 Military Education and Training
 Military Science
 Pedagogy

External links
 International Association for Military Pedagogy (IAMP)
 European Research Group On Military And Society (ERGOMAS)
 International Military Testing Association (IMTA)
 International Society of Military Sciences (OSMS)

Military-related organizations
Military education and training
Education
Pedagogy
Higher education
Organizations established in 2005